Peter Leeds (May 30, 1917 – November 12, 1996) was an American actor who appeared on television more than 8,000 times and also had many film, Broadway, and radio credits.  The majority of his work took place in the 1950s and 1960s.  Working with many well-known comedians, he became popular as a straight man to their antics.

Beyond situation comedies, Peter Leeds was also a dramatic actor, a Broadway performer, and a regular on many variety shows.  He made three guest appearances on Perry Mason.

Peter Leeds was also a popular voice-over artist, being heard on over 3,000 radio shows.

Early life
 
A native of Bayonne, New Jersey, Leeds received his training at the Neighborhood Playhouse. He made his film debut with a bit part in Public Enemies (1941). He received a scholarship from the John Marshall Law School, which he attended for one year. He also attended The Neighborhood Playhouse School of the Theatre in New York City. Leeds was noticed by the Group Theater of New York, through which he received a scholarship and graduated.

Career

Leeds worked with hundreds of well-known actors, including Bob Hope, Lucille Ball, Milton Berle, Carol Burnett, Red Skelton, Jack Benny, Jerry Lewis, Dean Martin, and Johnny Carson. He appeared four times with David Janssen in the crime drama, Richard Diamond, Private Detective. Leeds was cast as George Colton in nine episodes of the 1960s CBS sitcom, Pete and Gladys. He guest-starred on an episode of the 1961 crime adventure-drama series The Investigators and on an episode of the 1962-1963 ABC drama series, Going My Way. In 1965, he guest-starred in an episode of The Cara Williams Show.

Leeds was known for his association with Stan Freberg and played his foil in several song parodies. In addition, he had several roles on both Volume One and Volume Two of the classic comedy albums Stan Freberg Presents the United States of America, and also appeared as a regular on the short-lived CBS radio series The Stan Freberg Show in 1957.

Leeds had a recurring role as gambler/saloon owner Tenner Smith in the 1957-1959 CBS television series, Trackdown.

Leeds appeared in three episodes of Perry Mason including murderer Bill Emory in the 1958 episode "The Case of the Sunbather's Diary.

Leeds played federal agent LaMarr Kane in "The Scarface Mob", the pilot for ABC's The Untouchables TV series, a role taken over in the actual series by Chuck Hicks. He was a member of the casts of the 1958 version of The Betty White Show and The Buster Keaton Show , and made an appearance on Batman (TV show) (year two, episodes 29 and 30).

USO tours
Leeds accompanied Bob Hope on 14 international USO (United Service Organizations) tours.

Voice work
Leeds also did voices for animated television and film, including The Nine Lives of Fritz the Cat, Hong Kong Phooey, The New Yogi Bear Show, The Dukes, Challenge of the GoBots, CBS Storybreak, and The Jetsons. He was also on the CBS radio program, The Stan Freberg Show along with Daws Butler and June Foray.

Broadway
Leeds appeared on Broadway in the first cast of Sugar Babies along with Mickey Rooney and Ann Miller in 1979.

Personal life
Leeds and his wife of 34 years, Pat Leeds, had a son, Dr. Michael Leeds. Leeds died of cancer at the age of 79, on November 12, 1996 in Los Angeles, California.

American Federation of Television and Radio Artists
During the 1970s, Leeds spent five years as the president of the Los Angeles chapter of the American Federation of Television and Radio Artists (AFTRA). He later served on the actors' union's national and local Board of Directors. In 1992, AFTRA repaid his many years of service with its highest honor, the Gold Card. Leeds later served on the Board of Governors for the Academy of Television Arts & Sciences.

Filmography

References

External links

1917 births
1996 deaths
American male stage actors
American male film actors
American male television actors
American male voice actors
American male radio actors
Actors from Bayonne, New Jersey
Male actors from Los Angeles
20th-century American male actors